Kathleen Rowe McAllen (born c. 1960) is an American actress, best known for appearing in stage musicals and soap operas.

Biography
Kathleen Rowe McAllen was born in the San Francisco Bay Area and attended UC Berkeley and UCLA as a pre-med major.

Turning to acting, she appeared in Broadway and Off-Broadway productions of The Human Comedy, Into the Woods, Joseph and the Amazing Technicolor Dreamcoat, A Little Night Music, Merrily We Roll Along, and On Your Toes. In 1990 she won a Theatre World Award for her performance as Giulietta Trapani in Aspects of Love. She was also nominated for the Tony Award for Best Featured Actress in a Musical the same year. In 1997 she played Dulcinea in Man of La Mancha and Mary Bailey in A Wonderful Life.

McAllen acted in the television soap operas As the World Turns, Loving, and All My Children. She reprised the role of Giulietta Trapani in a 1993 television film adaptation of Aspects of Love. Her sole theatrical film credit is for the role of Gabrielle/Julie in the low-budget 1981 horror film Fear No Evil, about which she later said, "Every time I see it I absolutely cringe. I am the worst actress in the entire thing; I was 20 years old and terrified."

Filmography
 Fear No Evil (film, 1981)
 As the World Turns (television, 1981–1982)
 Loving (television, 1985)
 All My Children, (television, 1988)
 Aspects of Love (TV movie, 1993)

References

External links
 
 

20th-century American actresses
Actresses from the San Francisco Bay Area
American musical theatre actresses
American soap opera actresses
Living people
1960 births
Year of birth uncertain
21st-century American women